Qaysān or Qeissan or Abdullah Qeissan or Abdullah is a town in Blue Nile State, south-eastern Sudan near the border with Ethiopia.

References

Populated places in Blue Nile (state)